Planetmaster is a 1984 video game published by Magnetic Harvest.

Gameplay
Planetmaster is a game in which conservation for survival is part of the simulation, as the player must transport six endangered alien species to the Space Sanctuary Satellite.

Reception
Johnny Wilson reviewed the game for Computer Gaming World, and stated that "The simulation not only sensitizes the player to the idea of wildlife preservation and management, but teaches the basic principle of ecological interdependence."

References

External links
Review in Softalk
Review in Electronic Games

1984 video games